Africa Before Dark is a 1928 American animated short film featuring Oswald the Lucky Rabbit, directed by Walt Disney and Ub Iwerks.

Plot summary
Oswald is big-game hunting in Africa, and is riding an elephant, which trips and then accidentally sits on Oswald, crushing him flat. The elephant blows air into Oswald, reinflating him. A variety of African animals are playing games, including two monkeys playing tic-tac-toe on a tiger's back. Oswald stealthily approaches with a rifle and shoots numerous shots at the animals, who all vanish. An owl laughs at Oswald, and angered, he shoots the owl. A baby tiger approaches Oswald, kicks him and runs away. Oswald chases it, and the tiger runs into a burrow in the ground. Oswald tries to shoot it but the tiger redirects his rifle so that Oswald shoots himself. The tiger runs into a hollow log and Oswald produces an enormous handgun. Instead of the baby tiger, several huge lions emerge from the log, and Oswald's gun dwindles into a tiny pop-gun. Oswald runs away, chased by the lions. He leaps onto his elephant's back and they continue to run from the lions. The elephant then flaps his ears and flies away, carrying Oswald to safety.

Releases
The short was released on February 20, 1928, by Universal Pictures.

The film was thought to be lost before a fragment was discovered in 2009 and later a full copy was found at the Austrian Film Museum in Vienna. The film was restored by Walt Disney Animation Studios and shown at a screening on June 13, 2015, with live orchestration provided by the Los Angeles Chamber Orchestra.<ref name="KPCC">{{Cite web|url=http://www.scpr.org/programs/the-frame/2015/06/11/43241/poor-papa-long-lost-disney-cartoon-gets-new-life-t/ |title=Poor Papa': Long-lost Disney cartoon gets new life thanks to the LA Chamber Orchestra |accessdate=November 29, 2015 |work=KPCC|date=11 June 2015 }}</ref>

It was released as a bonus item on the 2017 Blu-ray release of Bambi''.

References

External links

1928 comedy films
1928 films
1928 animated films
1928 short films
American black-and-white films
Oswald the Lucky Rabbit cartoons
American silent short films
Films directed by Walt Disney
Films directed by Ub Iwerks
1920s Disney animated short films
1920s rediscovered films
Universal Pictures animated short films
Animated films about animals
Rediscovered American films
1920s American animated films
Animated films without speech
Films about hunters
Films set in Africa
Silent American comedy films